The list of shipwrecks in 2001 includes ships sunk, foundered, grounded, or otherwise lost during 2001.

January

1 January

16 January

19 January

20 January

30 January

31 January

February

8 February

9 February

10 February

14 February

18 February

March

5 March

6 March

21 March

April

2 April

May

5 May

11 May

15 May

25 May

31 May

June

19 June

25 June

Unknown date

July

6 July

10 July

12 July

16 July

22 July

26 July

27 July

August

4 August

6 August

11 August

16 August

19 August

24 August

25 August

27 August

Unknown date

September

1 September

5 September

12 September

20 September

October

9 October

11 October

13 October

16 October

19 October

20 October

23 October

28 October

30 October

31 October

November

18 November

24 November

26 November

December

11 December

22 December

Unknown

References

2001
Shipwrecks